Two Solutions for One Problem (Dow Rahehal Baraye yek Massaleh) is a 1975 Iranian short film directed by Abbas Kiarostami.

Plot
During breaktime, Dara and Nader have a fierce argument about a torn exercise book that the former has given back to the latter. There are two possible outcomes, which the film shows one after the other. One is that Dara wants to get his own back, and the two boys start a violent fight; the other is that they work together to mend the exercise book with a little glue.

See also
List of Iranian films

External links

Films directed by Abbas Kiarostami
1975 films
1970s Persian-language films
Iranian short films
1975 short films